Brimley State Park is a public recreation area covering  on the shore of Whitefish Bay at the far eastern end of Lake Superior in the U.S. state of Michigan. It is located on the northeast side of the Village of Brimley, eleven miles southwest of Sault Ste. Marie. The state park was established in 1922 when the village gave the park's first  to the state for park purposes. The park offers facilities for camping, picnicking, swimming, fishing, and boating.

References

External links
Brimley State Park Michigan Department of Natural Resources
Brimley State Park Map Michigan Department of Natural Resources

State parks of Michigan
Protected areas of Chippewa County, Michigan
Protected areas established in 1922
1922 establishments in Michigan
IUCN Category III